Walter Holmes (1892 – 1973) was a British communist activist and journalist.

In 1912, Holmes found work in a chemical plant in the East End of London.  He became a supporter of Sylvia Pankhurst, and worked with her to support women's suffrage, and later to opposed World War I.  In 1916, Holmes began volunteering for the Fabian Research Bureau, but was imprisoned as a conscientious objector, and only released in 1919.

On release, Holmes became associated with the guild socialist movement.  Inspired by the October Revolution, he became a communist, and a leading figure in the Guild Communist faction of the National Guilds League.  This became a founding part of the Communist Party of Great Britain (CPGB), in which Holmes remained active.

During the early 1920s, Holmes worked as a journalist for the Daily Herald.  He married Dona Torr, the newspaper's librarian.  In 1928, he took over from William Paul as the editor of the CPGB's own Sunday Worker newspaper, serving until 1930, when it was replaced by the Daily Worker.  He became a full-time correspondent for the new paper, writing the regular "Workers Notebook" column, and serving as a war correspondent in Manchuria, and later in Ethiopia - the only British journalist to remain in Ethiopia throughout the Italian invasion.

In 1941, the Daily Worker was banned, and Holmes set up the Industrial and General Information Service as a temporary replacement.  The ban was soon lifted, and Holmes returned to working for the Daily Worker, also serving as chair of the paper's Communist Party Committee.  He was the paper's correspondent at the Nuremberg Trials, and remained with the paper until his retirement in 1966.

References

1892 births
1973 deaths
Communist Party of Great Britain members
English journalists